Beach Weather is an American pop rock band formed in 2015 by lead vocalist and rhythm guitarist Nick Santino, best known for their song "Sex, Drugs, Etc."

Beach Weather has released three EPs and their debut full-length album, Pineapple Sunrise, was released on March 3, 2023, through Arista Records.

History

Formation, first years and hiatus (2015–2017)
In August 2015, Nick Santino formed Beach Weather with Reeve Powers (bass), Ian Holubiak (lead guitar) and Austin Scates (drums) after being invited by the Maine to open for their Free For All 2015 Tour. Their debut EP What a Drag was written by Santino and Sean Silverman (of The Technicolors) and released on August 28, 2015, via 8123.

On February 3, 2016, Beach Weather released a music video for "New Skin", and on June 28, 2016, for "Swoon".

In February-March 2016, Beach Weather supported Sleeping with Sirens through Europe and the UK on their Madness Tour alongside This Wild Life and Mallory Knox. In May 2016, the band supported PVRIS on their North America Headlining Summer Tour. In September 2016, Beach Weather toured with Against the Current on their In Our Bones World Tour alongside As It Is.

On September 14, 2016, Beach Weather released a single "Someone's Disaster". Their second EP, Chit Chat, produced by Alex and Sean Silverman, was released on November 4, 2016, via 8123. On October 13, 2016, the band released a music video for "Chit Chat".

In March-May 2017, Beach Weather toured US with The Maine and The Mowgli's. 

On July 14, 2017, the band released Basement Sessions EP and a day later announced that they will be taking a hiatus indefinitely.

Comeback, "Sex, Drugs, Etc." and Pineapple Sunrise (2022-present)
On January 20, 2022, after nearly five years of being on hiatus, Beach Weather performed at the Rebel Lounge for 8123 fest.

In June 2022, the song "Sex, Drugs, etc." grew popular on TikTok, after which Beach Weather released a music video in September 2022, six years after the song was first released as a part of Chit Chat EP. The song got #1 on Billboard's Alternative Airplay Chart for the week of October 27, 2022, and peaked at #2 on Bubbling Under Hot 100 chart for the week of February 11, 2023.

On August 12, 2022, Beach Weather released their first single in six years, "Unlovable", with a music video for it released on September 14, 2022. On November 11, 2022, Beach Weather released the single and music video for "Trouble With This Bed". The band also announced their debut full-length album "Pineapple Sunrise", releasing March 3, 2023 via last nite/Arista Records.

Beach Weather performed "Sex, Drugs, etc." on Jimmy Kimmel Live! on November 28th, 2022. In 2023, the song was certified Silver by British Phonographic Industry (BPI).

On January 11, 2023, the band was nominated Best New Artist (Alternative & Rock) at 2023 iHeartRadio Music Awards. On January 14, 2023, Beach Weather played at iHeartRadio ALTer EGO sharing the stage with Red Hot Chili Peppers, Muse and Fall Out Boy among others.

On January 20, 2023, Beach Weather released the single "Homebody" along with a music video.

In June 2023, Beach Weather is set to tour with lovelytheband on their If We're Being Honest tour.

Members
Current members
 Nick Santino – lead vocals, rhythm guitar (2015–2017, 2022-present)
 Reeve Powers – bass, backing vocals (2015-2017, 2022-present)
 Sean Silverman - lead guitar (2022-present)

Touring members
 Alex Silverman - keyboard (2022-present)
 Jeremy Wolda - drums (2022-present)

Past members
 Austin Scates - drums (2015-2017)
 Ian Holubiak - lead guitar (2015)

Discography

Studio albums
 Pineapple Sunrise (2023)

Extended plays
 What a Drag (2015)
 Chit Chat (2016)
 Basement Sessions (2017)

Singles
 Wolf (2015)
 Someone's Disaster (2016)
 Chit Chat (2016)
 Unlovable (2022)
 Trouble With This Bed (2022)
 Sex, Drugs, Etc. (Stripped Down) (2022)
 Sex, Drugs, Etc. (Sped Up Version) (2022)
 Homebody (2023)
 Hard Feelings (2023)

Music videos

Awards and nominations

iHeartRadio Music Awards

|-
|| 2023 ||  Beach Weather ||Best New Artist (Alternative & Rock)|| 
|-

References

Alternative rock groups from Massachusetts
American pop rock music groups
Indie rock musical groups from Massachusetts
Musical groups established in 2015